A Thrill's A Thrill: The Canadian Years is a compilation album of Long John Baldry. The album collects the best of his time with EMI Capitol, Musicline Records and Stony Plain Records.

Track listing 
Disc 1
 "Baldry's Out" - 4:38 (1979 - Baldry's Out!)
 "Stealer" - 3:34 (1979 - Baldry's Out!)
 "You've Lost That Loving Feeling" - 5:11 (1979 - Baldry's Out!)
 "Find You" - 3:24 (1979 - Baldry's Out!)
 "Come And Get Your Love" - 4:326 (1979 - Baldry's Out!)
 "A Thrill's A Thrill" - 5:34 (1979 - Previously unreleased radio version)
 "Savoir Faire" - 3:31 (1980 - Long John Baldry)
 "Any Day Now" - 3:28 (1980 - Long John Baldry)
 "Morning Dew" - 4:35 (1980 - Long John Baldry)
 "You're Good With Your Love" - 2:51 (1980 - Long John Baldry)
 "Run Johnny Run" - 3:01 (1980 - Long John Baldry)
 "I Want You I Love You" - 2:39 (1980 - Long John Baldry)
 "Love Is A Killer" - 3:15 (1980 - Long John Baldry)
 "Darlin'" - 4:24 (1979 - Baldry's Out!)
 "River's Invitation" - 3:54 (1982 - The Best Of Long John Baldry)
 "Passing Glances" - 3:22 (1981 - Rock With The Best)

Disc 2
 "Passing Glances" - 4:40 (1981 - Previously unreleased alternate version)
 "Rock With The Best" - 3:48 (1981 - Rock With The Best)
 "It Ain't Easy" - 3:55 (1993 - On Stage Tonight - Baldry's Out!)
 "25 Years Of Pain" - 3:49 (1981 - Rock With The Best)
 "Stay The Way You Are" - 3:39 (1981 - Rock With The Best)
 "Bad Attitude" - 3:29 (1981 - Rock With The Best)
 "Let The Heartaches Stop" - 4:42 (1981 - Rock With The Best)
 "Ain't No Love In The Heart Of The City" - 4:26 (1986 - Silent Treatment)
 "This Is Japan" - 4:21 (1986 - Silent Treatment)
 "The Sun Ain't Gonna Shine Anymore" - 3:27 (1985 - Silent Treatment)
 "Here Comes Another Fool" - 4:14 (1986 - Silent Treatment)
 "It Still Ain't Easy" - 4:11 (1991 - It Still Ain't Easy)
 "Midnight In New Orleans" - 3:26 (1991 - It Still Ain't Easy)
 "Don't Try To Lay No Boogie Woogie" - 8:54 (1993 - On Stage Tonight - Baldry's Out!)

1995 compilation albums
Long John Baldry albums
EMI Records compilation albums